Carmen de Apicalá is a town and municipality in the Tolima Department of Colombia.

External links 
 Homepage (Spanish)

Municipalities of Tolima Department